The Notorious Lady is a surviving 1927 American silent drama film produced by Sam E. Rork and distributed by First National Pictures. It was directed by veteran director King Baggot and starred Barbara Bedford and Lewis Stone.

The film was based on the 1925 play The River by British writer Patrick Hastings. Producer Rork's daughter, Ann Rork, has a leading role in the film.

Cast

Preservation
The film is preserved at the Library of Congress and is available on home video and DVD.

References

External links

American Film Institute

Lobby poster

1927 films
American silent feature films
Films directed by King Baggot
American films based on plays
First National Pictures films
1927 adventure films
American adventure films
American black-and-white films
Films with screenplays by Jane Murfin
Films with screenplays by Gerald Duffy
Films set in Africa
1920s American films
Silent adventure films